The Stejar is a right tributary of the river Mureș in Romania. It discharges into the Mureș in Stejar. Its name means Oak tree in Romanian and "Deer Branch" in Hungarian.

References

Rivers of Romania
Rivers of Arad County